Barney Bear is an American series of animated cartoon short subjects produced by Metro-Goldwyn-Mayer cartoon studio. The title character is an anthropomorphic cartoon character, a sluggish, sleepy bear who often is in pursuit of nothing but peace and quiet. 26 Barney Bear cartoons were produced between 1939 and 1954.

History

The character was created for Metro-Goldwyn-Mayer by director Rudolf Ising, who based the bear's grumpy yet pleasant disposition on his own and derived many of his mannerisms from the screen actor Wallace Beery. The character was voiced by Rudolf Ising from 1939 to 1941, Pinto Colvig in 1941, Billy Bletcher from 1944 to 1949, Paul Frees from 1952 until 1954, Frank Welker in 1980, Lou Scheimer in 1980, Jeff Bergman in 2004, and Richard McGonagle from 2012 to 2013. Barney Bear made his first appearance in The Bear That Couldn't Sleep in 1939, and by 1941 was the star of his own series, getting an Oscar nomination for his fourth cartoon, the 1941 short The Rookie Bear. Ising left the studio in 1943. Three additional cartoons were produced and directed by George Gordon before he too left in 1945.

Ising's original Barney design contained a plethora of detail: shaggy fur, wrinkled clothing, and six eyebrows; as the series progressed, the design was gradually simplified and streamlined, reaching its peak in three late 1940s shorts, the only output of the short-lived directorial team of Preston Blair and Michael Lah. Lah and Blair's cartoons had a direction much more closer to cartoons by Hanna-Barbera and Tex Avery. Both worked as animators (and Lah ultimately as co-director) on several of Avery's pictures. The last original Barney Bear cartoons were released between 1952 and 1954, directed by Ex-Disney/Lantz animator Dick Lundy. Lundy used Avery's unit to produce these cartoons while the latter was taking a one-year sabbatical from the studio. In the films from the late 1940s and early 1950s, Barney's design was streamlined and simplified, much the same as those of Tom and Jerry. 

In the 1941 cartoon The Prospecting Bear, Barney is paired with a donkey named Benny Burro. Though Benny would only make two further cartoon appearances, he would later feature as Barney's partner in numerous comic book stories. In the 1944 Avery cartoon Screwball Squirrel, Barney Bear is mentioned by Sammy Squirrel as he talks to Screwy Squirrel at the beginning.

Barney Bear would not appear in new material again until Filmation's The Tom and Jerry Comedy Show in 1980. More recently, Barney Bear appeared in the direct-to-video films Tom and Jerry: Robin Hood and His Merry Mouse in 2012 and in Tom and Jerry's Giant Adventure in 2013. Giant Adventure once again paired Barney with Benny Burro. Barney Bear also made cameo appearances in Tom and Jerry Meet Sherlock Holmes in 2010 and Tom and Jerry: Back to Oz in 2016.

Plot
The series begins with the title character, Barney Bear, usually trying to accomplish a task in his series, He can be a bit lazy, but not too lazy. But, Barney tends to overdo or do his task the wrong way. He also has a hard time going to sleep, but when he finally does go to sleep, he is a heavy sleeper. Mostly he doesn't talk, but sometimes he does talk.

At times he pairs with a donkey named Benny Burro, a curious donkey who accompanies Barney on several occasions, but mostly when he's in the west (Benny Burro never spoke, but he did speak in comic books).

Controversy
Like many animated cartoons from the 1930s to the early 1950s, Barney Bear featured racial stereotypes. After explosions, for example, characters with blasted faces would resemble stereotypical blacks, with large lips, bow-tied hair and speaking in black vernacular. 

In one particular cartoon, The Little Wise Quacker, when the duck kite hit the electricity cables, and Barney's face turned black because the electricity hit him, he rocked the duckling (also in blackface) and sang "Shortnin' Bread". Cartoon Network and Boomerang would usually omit these scenes on re-airings.

MGM filmography

Home media
A selection of Barney Bear cartoons have been released on VHS tapes and Happy Harmonies Cartoon Classics laserdisc by MGM/UA Home Video in the 1980s and 1990s.

The following cartoons can be found as extras on DVDs or Blu-rays of classic Warner Home Video films of the period:
 The Fishing Bear is on the DVD and the Blu-ray of Pride and Prejudice
 The Rookie Bear is on the DVD of Lady Be Good
 Bah Wilderness is on the DVD of Du Barry Was a Lady
 Bear Raid Warden is on the DVD of Thirty Seconds Over Tokyo
 The Unwelcome Guest is on the DVD of Easy to Wed
 The Bear and the Hare is on the DVD of On an Island with You (albeit with fake stereo sound)
 Barney's Hungry Cousin is on the Blu-ray of Kiss Me Kate
 Cobs and Robbers is on the DVD of Easy to Love (albeit with fake stereo sound)

In 2017, most of the Barney Bear shorts were released on the Boomerang streaming app.

Comic books
Barney Bear began appearing in comic books in 1942. Dell Comics licensed various MGM characters, including Barney Bear. He appeared in backup stories in Our Gang Comics (1942–49) starting in the first issue; then—from 1949—in Tom and Jerry Comics (later just Tom and Jerry) and its spinoffs.  From Our Gang #11-36 (1944-1947), Carl Barks took over the writing and drawing of the series. Barks regularly teamed Barney up with Benny Burro; later, the obnoxious neighbor Mooseface McElk was also introduced.

Mooseface was created for Barks by Western Publishing colleague Gil Turner, who wrote and drew the Barney stories for several years after Barks' run ended. Later, post-Turner talents introduced other characters, including Barney's nephews Fuzzy and Wuzzy. Other artists who've worked on Barney Bear have been Lynn Karp.

In 2011, Yoe Books issued a hardback volume collecting Carl Barks' work on the series.

List of comics
 Our Gang Comics (1947) (Dell)
 Our Gang With Tom & Jerry (1949) (Dell)
 Barney Bear Comics (1949) (Magazine Management-Australia)
 Barney Bear's Bumper Book Of Comics (1950) (Rosnock-Australia)
 Woody Woodpecker Back to School (1952) (Dell)
 Tom & Jerry Winter Carnival (1952) (Dell)
 M.G.M.'s Tom & Jerry's Winter Fun #3 (1954) (Dell)
 M.G.M.'s Tom & Jerry's Winter Fun #4 (1955) (Dell)
 M.G.M.'s Tom & Jerry's Winter Fun #5 (1956) (Dell)
 M.G.M.'s Tom & Jerry's Winter Fun #6 (1957) (Dell)
 M.G.M's The Mouse Musketeers (1957) (Dell)
 Tom and Jerry's Summer Fun (1957) (Dell)
 M.G.M.'s Tom & Jerry's Winter Fun #7 (1958) (Dell)
 Tom & Jerry Picnic Time (1958) (Dell)
 Tom and Jerry Comics (1962) (Dell)
 Golden Comics Digest (1970) (Gold Key)
 TV Comic Annual (1975) (Polystyle)
 Tom and Jerry Winter Special (1977)
 Tom and Jerry Holiday Special (1978) (Polystyle)
 Tom and Jerry (1979) (Gold Key)
 Barks Bear Book (1979) (Editions  Enfin)
 Tom & Jerry Julehefte (1987) (Semic International)
 Tex Avery's Wolf & Red #1 (1995) (Dark Horse Comics) (appearance as a plush toy bear)
 Carl Barks' Big Book of Barney Bear (2011) (IDW Publishing)

References

External links
 Barney Bear at Don Markstein's Toonopedia. Archived from the original on August 27, 2015.

Animated film series
Bear, Barney
Bear, Barney
Metro-Goldwyn-Mayer animated short films
Comedy film series
Fictional anthropomorphic characters
Film characters introduced in 1939
Film series introduced in 1939
Films adapted into comics
Bear, Barney
Metro-Goldwyn-Mayer cartoon studio film series